Szymczak is a gender-neutral Polish surname. In some English-speaking countries it is spelled Schimchak, for the sake of pronunciation. It may refer to:

 Andrzej Szymczak (1948–2016), Polish handball player
 Christian Szymczak (born 1974), American racecar driver
 Filip Szymczak, Polish footballer
 Ryszard Szymczak (1944–1996), Polish footballer
 Zbigniew Szymczak (1952-2019), Polish chess player

Polish-language surnames